Mountain Time contains all counties in the Nebraska Panhandle plus the following counties:
Arthur County
Chase County
Dundy County
Grant County
Hooker County
Keith County
Perkins County

Most of Cherry County is contained in the Mountain Time Zone, but the eastern fourth is in the Central Time Zone, which also contains the rest of the state.

IANA time zone database
The 2 zones for Nebraska as given by zone.tab of the IANA time zone database. Columns marked * are from the zone.tab.

See also
 Time in the United States

Nebraska
Geography of Nebraska